Tenzing is a Tibetan given name, a variant spelling of Tenzin. Notable people with the name include:
 Tenzing Norgay (1914–1986), Nepalese mountaineer in the first Everest ascent.
 Jamling Tenzing Norgay (born 1965), Nepalese mountaineer (son of Tenzing Norgay)
 Tashi Tenzing (born 1965), Nepalese mountaineer (maternal grandson of Tenzing Norgay)

See also
Ten Sing, a method of youth work

Fictional characters
 Tenzing Tharkay (Temeraire series), a character in the novel series Temeraire by Naomi Novik

Tibetan names